Laboratory developed test (LDT) is a term used to refer to a certain class of in vitro diagnostics (IVDs) that, in the U.S., were traditionally regulated under the Clinical Laboratory Improvement Amendments program.

United States
In the United States, the Food and Drug Administration (FDA) has determined that while such tests qualify as medical devices, these products could enter the market without prior approval from the agency. In 2014, the FDA announced that it would start regulating some LDTs. In general, however, it has not done so, as of April 2019.

As LDTs do not require FDA 510(k) clearance required by other diagnostic tests, they have been viewed as a regulatory loophole by opponents.

Direct-to-consumer 
Direct-to-consumer tests are regulated as medical devices, although they are not necessarily reviewed by the FDA.

23andMe direct-to-consumer genetic tests were originally offered as LDTs, but the FDA challenged that and forced the company to submit the test for approval as a class II medical device.

Companies 
Several companies offer lab-developed tests.

References

Medical technology